The Rockmen Guardians are a group of sculptures located in Rockford, Illinois, United States, south of the Sinnissippi greenhouse on the west side of the Rock River recreation path. There are four figures composed of granite and cement.  The artist is Terese Agnew of Milwaukee, Wisconsin.

The work was built in autumn 1987 and spring 1988 and the statues are about 12 feet (3.7 m) tall.

References

1987 sculptures
Culture of Rockford, Illinois
Outdoor sculptures in Illinois
Tourist attractions in Rockford, Illinois
1988 sculptures